Orange Township may refer to two townships in the U.S. state of Michigan:

 Orange Township, Ionia County, Michigan
 Orange Township, Kalkaska County, Michigan

Michigan township disambiguation pages